Simple English may refer to:

 Basic English, a controlled language, created by Charles Kay Ogden, which only contains a small number of words
 Learning English (version of English), used by the Voice of America broadcasting service
 Plain English
 New General Service List
 Simplified Technical English, a controlled language originally developed for aerospace industry maintenance manuals

See also 

 Simple English Wikipedia
 Simple English Wiktionary
Français Fondamental...
Vocabolario di base ( in italian : Basic italian )

Controlled English